Valentina Rodini (born 28 January 1995) is an Italian rower. She competed in the women's lightweight double sculls event at the 2016 Summer Olympics, and won gold medal in the same event at 2020 Summer Olympics.

Career 
She competed at the 2013 World Rowing Junior Championships winning a gold medal, and  2015 Summer Universiade, winning a bronze medal.

References

External links
 

1995 births
Living people
Italian female rowers
Olympic rowers of Italy
Rowers at the 2016 Summer Olympics
Rowers at the 2020 Summer Olympics
Place of birth missing (living people)
Competitors at the 2018 Mediterranean Games
Mediterranean Games gold medalists for Italy
Mediterranean Games medalists in rowing
Rowers of Fiamme Gialle
Universiade bronze medalists for Italy
Medalists at the 2015 Summer Universiade
Medalists at the 2020 Summer Olympics
Olympic medalists in rowing
Olympic gold medalists for Italy
20th-century Italian women
21st-century Italian women